The Garda Museum is a police museum located in Dublin, Ireland, located in the Treasury Building of Dublin Castle.

Opened in 2017 and designed by Dara Lynne Lenehan, it covers the history of policing in the Republic of Ireland (excluding Northern Ireland), including medieval watchmen, the Baronial Constabulary, County Constabulary, the Dublin Metropolitan Police, the Royal Irish Constabulary and the Civic Guard/Garda Síochána.

The then Commissioner Nóirín O'Sullivan officially opened it in December 2016, but legal disputes meant that the public could not visit until August 2017. It replaced an older museum which had been housed in the Record Tower.

References

External links
Official site

Museum
History museums in the Republic of Ireland
Law enforcement museums in Europe
Museums in Dublin (city)
Museums established in 2017
2017 establishments in Ireland